The Next Mutation may refer to:
Ninja Turtles: The Next Mutation, an American television series
Space Quest V, an adventure game, subtitled The Next Mutation
RAWGWAR: The Next Mutation, a video release from Gwar